Albert Einstein (1879–1955) was a renowned theoretical physicist of the 20th century, best known for his theories of special relativity and general relativity.  He also made important contributions to statistical mechanics, especially his treatment of Brownian motion, his resolution of the paradox of specific heats, and his connection of fluctuations and dissipation.  Despite his reservations about its interpretation, Einstein also made seminal contributions to quantum mechanics and, indirectly, quantum field theory, primarily through his theoretical studies of the photon.

Einstein's scientific publications are listed below in four tables: journal articles, book chapters, books and authorized translations.   Each publication is indexed in the first column by its number in the Schilpp bibliography (Albert Einstein: Philosopher–Scientist, pp. 694–730) and by its article number in Einstein's Collected Papers.  Complete references for these two bibliographies may be found below in the Bibliography section.  The Schilpp numbers are used for cross-referencing in the Notes (the final column of each table), since they cover a greater time period of Einstein's life at present.  The English translations of titles are generally taken from the published volumes of the Collected Papers.  For some publications, however, such official translations are not available; unofficial translations are indicated with a § superscript. Although the tables are presented in chronological order by default, each table can be re-arranged in alphabetical order for any column by the reader clicking on the arrows at the top of that column.  For illustration, to re-order a table by subject—e.g., to group together articles that pertain to "General relativity" or "Specific heats"—one need only click on the arrows in the "Classification and Notes" columns.  To print out the re-sorted table, one may print it directly by using the web-browser Print option; the "Printable version" link at the left gives only the default sorting.  Collaborative works by Einstein are highlighted in lavender, with the co-authors provided in the final column of the table.

In addition to his scientific publications, the Schilpp bibliography notes over 130 of Einstein's non-scientific works, often on humanitarian or political topics (pp. 730–746). There were also five volumes of Einstein's Collected Papers (volumes 1, 5, 8–10) that are devoted to his correspondence, much of which is concerned with scientific questions, but were never prepared for publication.

Chronology and major themes

The following chronology of Einstein's scientific discoveries provides a context for the publications listed below, and clarifies the major themes running through his work. The first four entries come from his Annus Mirabilis papers or miracle year papers.

 In 1905, Einstein proposed the existence of the photon, an elementary particle associated with electromagnetic radiation (light), which was the foundation of quantum theory.  In 1909, Einstein showed that the photon carries momentum as well as energy and that electromagnetic radiation must have both particle-like and wave-like properties if Planck's law holds; this was a forerunner of the principle of wave–particle duality. He would go on to receive the 1921 Nobel Prize in Physics for this work.
 In 1905, Einstein developed a theory of Brownian motion in terms of fluctuations in the number of molecular collisions with an object, providing further evidence that matter was composed of atoms.  A few weeks earlier, he had derived the Einstein relation for diffusion, which was the first example of the general fluctuation-dissipation theorem and allowed a good estimate of the Avogadro constant.
 In 1905, Einstein developed the theory of special relativity, which reconciled the relativity of motion with the observed constancy of the speed of light (a paradox of 19th-century physics).  Special relativity is now a core principle of physics.  Its counterintuitive predictions that moving clocks run more slowly, that moving objects are shortened in their direction of motion, and that the order of events is not absolute have been confirmed experimentally.
 In 1905, Einstein developed his concept of Mass–energy equivalence. Its relation E=mc2 suggested that matter was a form of energy, which was later verified by the mass defect in atomic nuclei.  The energy released in nuclear reactions—which is essential for nuclear power and nuclear weapons—can be estimated from such mass defects.
 In 1907 and again in 1911, Einstein developed the first quantum theory of specific heats by generalizing Planck's law.  His theory resolved a paradox of 19th-century physics that specific heats were often smaller than could be explained by any classical theory.  His work was also the first to show that Planck's quantum mechanical law E=hν was a fundamental law of physics, and not merely special to blackbody radiation.
 Between 1907 and 1915, Einstein developed the theory of general relativity, a classical field theory of gravitation that provides the cornerstone for modern astrophysics and cosmology.  General relativity is based on the surprising idea that time and space dynamically interact with matter and energy, and has been checked experimentally in many ways, confirming its predictions of matter affecting the flow of time, frame dragging, black holes, and gravitational waves.

 In 1917, Einstein published the idea for the Einstein–Brillouin–Keller method for finding the quantum mechanical version of a classical system.  The famous Bohr model of the hydrogen atom is a simple example, but the EBK method also gives accurate predictions for more complicated systems, such as the dinuclear cations H2+ and HeH2+.
 In 1918, Einstein developed a general theory of the process by which atoms emit and absorb electromagnetic radiation (his A and B coefficients), which is the basis of lasers (stimulated emission) and shaped the development of modern quantum electrodynamics, the best-validated physical theory at present.
 In 1924, together with Satyendra Nath Bose, Einstein developed the theory of Bose–Einstein statistics and Bose–Einstein condensates, which form the basis for superfluidity, superconductivity, and other phenomena.
 In 1935, together with Boris Podolsky and Nathan Rosen, Einstein put forward what is now known as the EPR paradox, and argued that the quantum-mechanical wave function must be an incomplete description of the physical world.
 In the final thirty years of his life, Einstein explored whether various classical unified field theories could account for both electromagnetism and gravitation and, possibly, quantum mechanics.  However, his efforts were unsuccessful, since those theories did not match experimental observations.

Journal articles

Most of Einstein's original scientific work appeared as journal articles.  Articles on which Einstein collaborated with other scientists are highlighted in lavender, with the co-authors listed in the "Classification and notes" column. These are the total of 272 scientific articles.

{| class="wikitable sortable" id="Einstein_journal_articles"
!scope=col| Index
!scope=col|Year
!scope=col|Title and English translation
!scope=col|Journal, volume, pages
!scope=col|Classification and notes
|-
| Schilpp 1; CP 2, 1 || 1901 || Folgerungen aus den Kapillaritätserscheinungen

| Annalen der Physik (ser. 4), 4, 513–523, link || Intermolecular forces. The first of two papers in which Einstein proposed the (incorrect) theory that the interactions between all molecules are a universal function of distance, in analogy with the inverse-square force of gravity.  Once parameterized, his theory makes reasonably accurate predictions for heavier hydrophobic molecules, but fails for lighter molecules.
|-
| Schilpp 2; CP 2, 2 || 1902 || Thermodynamische Theorie der Potentialdifferenz zwischen Metallen und vollständig dissoziierten Lösungen ihrer Salze, und eine elektrische Methode zur Erforschung der Molekularkräfte

| Annalen der Physik (ser. 4), 8, 798–814, link || Intermolecular forces.  Einstein's second paper on a universal molecular energy function, this time applied to electrolytic solutions.  No data are available for comparison.  Einstein characterizes these two papers as "worthless" in 1907.
|-
| Schilpp 3; CP 2, 3 || 1902 || Kinetische Theorie des Wärmegleichgewichtes und des zweiten Hauptsatzes der Thermodynamik 

| Annalen der Physik (ser. 4), 9, 417–433, link || Statistical mechanics.  Study of the equipartition theorem and the definitions of temperature and entropy.
|-
| Schilpp 4; CP 2, 4 || 1903 || Eine Theorie der Grundlagen der Thermodynamik 

| Annalen der Physik (ser. 4), 11, 170–187, link || Statistical mechanics.  The problem of irreversibility in thermodynamics.
|-
| Schilpp 5; CP 2, 5 || 1904 || Allgemeine molekulare Theorie der Wärme 

| Annalen der Physik (ser. 4), 14, 354–362, link || Statistical mechanics.  Fluctuations and new methods for determining Boltzmann's constant.
|-
| CP 2, 6 || 1905 || Review of Giuseppe Belluzzo: "Principi di termodinamica grafica"

| Beiblätter zu den Annalen der Physik, 29, 78 || Thermodynamics.
|-
| CP 2, 7 || 1905 || Review of Albert Fliegner: "Über den Clausius'schen Entropiesatz"

| Beiblätter zu den Annalen der Physik, 29,  79 || Thermodynamics.
|-
| CP 2, 8 || 1905 || Review of William McFadden Orr: "On Clausius' Theorem for Irreversible Cycles, and on the Increase of Entropy"  
| Beiblätter zu den Annalen der Physik, 29, 79 || Thermodynamics.
|-
| CP 2, 9 || 1905 || Review of George Hartley Bryan: "The Law of Degradation of Energy as the Fundamental Principle of Thermodynamics" 
| Beiblätter zu den Annalen der Physik, 29, 80 || Thermodynamics.
|-
| CP 2, 10 || 1905 || Review of Nikolay Nikolayevich Schiller: "Einige Bedenken betreffend die Theorie der Entropievermehrung durch Diffusion der Gase bei einander gleichen Anfangsspannungen der letzteren"

| Beiblätter zu den Annalen der Physik, 29, 81 || Thermodynamics.
|-
| CP 2, 11 || 1905 || Review of Jakob Johann Weyrauch: "Über die spezifischen Wärmen des überhitzten Wasserdampfes"

| Beiblätter zu den Annalen der Physik, 29, 82 || Thermodynamics.
|-
| CP 2, 12 || 1905 || Review of Jacobus Henricus van't Hoff: "Einfluss der Änderung der spezifischen Wärme auf die Umwandlungsarbeit"

| Beiblätter zu den Annalen der Physik, 29, 82 || Thermodynamics.
|-
| CP 2, 13 || 1905 || Review of Arturo Giammarco: "Un caso di corrispondenza in termodinamica"

| Beiblätter zu den Annalen der Physik, 29, 84 || Thermodynamics.
|-
| Schilpp 7; CP 2, 14; Weil *6 || 1905 March 17|| Über einen die Erzeugung und Verwandlung des Lichtes betreffenden heuristischen Gesichtspunkt 

| Annalen der Physik (ser. 4), 17, 132–148, link ||  Photons.  Proposal of the photon as a quantum of energy, supported by many  independent arguments.
Remarkably, the first English translation did not appear until the sixtieth anniversary of the original work when it was published in the American Journal of Physics, Volume 33, Number 5, May 1965 (English translation by A.B. Arons and M.B. Peppard).
|-
| Schilpp 8; CP 2, 16; Weil *8 || 1905 || Über die von der molekularkinetischen Theorie der Wärme geforderte Bewegung von in ruhenden Flüssigkeiten suspendierten Teilchen 

| Annalen der Physik (ser. 4), 17, 549–560, link || Statistical mechanics.  Seminal treatment of Brownian motion, a type of translational diffusion.
|-
| CP 2, 17 || 1905 || Review of Karl Fredrik Slotte: "Über die Schmelzwärme"

| Beiblätter zu den Annalen der Physik, 29, 135 || Thermodynamics.
|-
| CP 2, 18 || 1905 || Review of Karl Fredrik Slotte: "Folgerungen aus einer thermodynamischen Gleichung"

| Beiblätter zu den Annalen der Physik, 29, 135 || Thermodynamics.
|-
| CP 2, 19 || 1905 || Review of Emile Mathias: "La constante a des diamètres rectilignes et les lois des états correspondents"

| Beiblätter zu den Annalen der Physik, 29, 136 || Thermodynamics.
|-
| CP 2, 20 || 1905 || Review of Max Planck: "On Clausius' Theorem for Irreversible Cycles, and on the Increase of Entropy" 
| Beiblätter zu den Annalen der Physik, 29, 29 (1905) 137 || Thermodynamics.
|-
| CP 2, 21 || 1905 || Review of Edgar Buckingham: "On Certain Difficulties Which Are Encountered in the Study of Thermodynamics"
| Beiblätter zu den Annalen der Physik, 29, 137 || Thermodynamics.
|-
| CP 2, 22 || 1905 || Review of Paul Langevin: "Sur une formule fondamentale de la théorie cinétique"

| Beiblätter zu den Annalen der Physik, 29, 138 || Thermodynamics.
|-
| Schilpp 9; CP 2, 23; Weil *9 || 1905 || Zur Elektrodynamik bewegter Körper 

| Annalen der Physik (ser. 4), 17, 891–921, link, Wikilivres ||  Special relativity.  This seminal paper gave birth to special relativity (SR).  In particular, it stated the two postulates of SR (uniform motion is undetectable, and the speed of light is always constant) and its kinematics.
|-
| Schilpp 10; CP 2, 24; Weil *10 || 1905 || Ist die Trägheit eines Körpers von seinem Energieinhalt abhängig? 

| Annalen der Physik (ser. 4), 18, 639–641, link ||  Special relativity.  A follow-on from his last paper, this paper derived the conclusion that mass was equivalent to an energy and vice versa, leading to the famous equation E=mc2.
|-
| CP 2, 25 || 1905 || Review of Heinrich Birven: Grundzüge der mechanischen Wärmetheorie

| Beiblätter zu den Annalen der Physik, 29, 175 || Thermodynamics.
|-
| CP 2, 26 || 1905 || Review of Auguste Ponsot: "Chaleur dans le déplacement de 1'équilibre d'un système capillaire"

| Beiblätter zu den Annalen der Physik, 29, 175 || Thermodynamics.
|-
| CP 2, 27 || 1905 || Review of Karl Bohlin: "Sur le choc, considéré comme fondement des théories cinétiques de la pression des gaz et de la gravitation universelle"

| Beiblätter zu den Annalen der Physik, 29, 176 || Thermodynamics.
|-
| CP 2, 28 || 1905 || Review of Georges Meslin: "Sur la constante de la loi de Mariotte et GayLussac"

| Beiblätter zu den Annalen der Physik, 29, 177 || Thermodynamics.
|-
| CP 2, 29 || 1905 || Review of Albert Fliegner: "Das Ausströmen heissen Wassers aus Gefässmündungen"

| Beiblätter zu den Annalen der Physik, 29, 177 || Thermodynamics.
|-
| CP 2, 30 || 1905 || Review of Jakob Johann Weyrauch: Grundriss der Wärmetheorie. Mit zahlreichen Beispielen und Anwendungen

| Beiblätter zu den Annalen der Physik, 29, 178 || Thermodynamics.
|-
| CP 2, 31 || 1905 || Review of Albert Fliegner: "Über den Wärmewert chemischer Vorgänge"

| Beiblätter zu den Annalen der Physik, 29, 179 || Thermodynamics.
|-
| Schilpp 11; CP 2, 33 || 1906 || Eine neue Bestimmung der Moleküldimensionen 

| Annalen der Physik (ser. 4), 19, 289–306, link ||  Statistical mechanics.  Hydrodynamic determination of molecular volumes.
|-
| Schilpp 12; CP 2, 32; Weil *11 || 1906 || Zur Theorie der Brownschen Bewegung 

| Annalen der Physik (ser. 4), 19, 371–381, link ||  Statistical mechanics.  Rotational Brownian motion, an example of rotational diffusion.
|-
| Schilpp 13; CP 2, 34; Weil *12 || 1906 || Theorie der Lichterzeugung und Lichtabsorption 

| Annalen der Physik (ser. 4), 20, 199–206, link ||  Photons. Einstein reconciles his and Planck's independent derivations of the blackbody formula E=hν.  Planck's derivation of this formula ascribed it to a restriction on the energy changes possible when radiation is produced or absorbed by matter, which implied no restriction on the energies of either matter or radiation.  Einstein's 1905 derivation ascribed it to a restriction on the energy of radiation alone, but in this paper, he proposes the modern idea that the energies of both matter and radiation are quantized, which led to his work on quantum specific heats, such as reference #16.
|-
| Schilpp 14; CP 2, 35 || 1906 || Prinzip von der Erhaltung der Schwerpunktsbewegung und die Trägheit der Energie 

| Annalen der Physik (ser. 4), 20, 627–633, link ||  Special relativity. First statement that the conservation of mass is a special case of the conservation of energy.
|-
| Schilpp 15; CP 2, 36 || 1906 || Eine Methode zur Bestimmung des Verhältnisses der transversalen und longitudinalen Masse des Elektrons 

| Annalen der Physik (ser. 4), 21, 583–586, link ||  Special relativity.  A French translation appeared in the journal L'Éclairage électrique, volume 49, pages 493–494.
|-
| CP 2, 37 || 1906 || Review of Max Planck: Vorlesungen über die Theorie der Wärmestrahlung

| Beiblätter zu den Annalen der Physik, 30, 211 || Statistical mechanics.
|-
| Schilpp 16; CP 2, 38; Weil *15 || 1907 || Plancksche Theorie der Strahlung und die Theorie der Spezifischen Wärme 

| Annalen der Physik (ser. 4), 22, 180–190, 800 link and correction and ||  Specific heats.  Seminal work applying Planck's law to the oscillations of atoms and molecules in solids.  Resolved the 19th-century paradox of the equipartition theorem in classical physics, and introduced the Einstein model of solids, which led to the current Debye model.  Showed that the quantum mechanical law E=hν was a general law of physics, and not merely special to blackbody radiation.
|-
| Schilpp 17; CP 2, 39 || 1907 || Gültigkeit des Satzes vom thermodynamischen Gleichgewicht und die Möglichkeit einer neuen Bestimmung der Elementarquanta 

| Annalen der Physik (ser. 4), 22, 569–572, link || Statistical mechanics.  Applies his theory of fluctuations to determine Boltzmann's constant from the voltage fluctuations in a capacitor.  Resulted in a novel low-noise technique for amplifying voltages, as described in reference #25.
|-
| Schilpp 18; CP 2, 41 || 1907 || Möglichkeit einer neuen Prüfung des Relativitätsprinzips 

| Annalen der Physik (ser. 4), 23, 197–198, link ||  Special relativity.  Einstein's discovery of the transverse Doppler effect, in which the perceived frequency is shifted even when the line between the wave source and receiver and the source's velocity are perpendicular.
|-
| Schilpp 19 || 1907 || Bemerkung zur Notiz des Herrn P. Ehrenfest: Translation deformierbarer Elektronen und der Flächensatz 

| Annalen der Physik (ser. 4), 23, 206–208, link ||  Special relativity.  Discusses the difficulty of applying Lorentz transformations to rigid bodies.
|-
| Schilpp 20; CP 2, 45 || 1907 || Die vom Relativätsprinzip geforderte Trägheit der Energie 

| Annalen der Physik (ser. 4), 23, 371–384, link ||  Special relativity.  First statement that the total energy of a  particle in rest equals E=mc2.  Derives the transformation of energy and momentum under the influence of external forces (relativistic dynamics).  Notes again the difficulty of applying Lorentz transformations to rigid bodies (see reference #19).  Finally, speculates that Maxwell's equations will prove to be the limiting case for  large numbers of light-quanta, just as thermodynamics is a limiting case of statistical mechanics.
|-
| CP 2, 46 || 1907 || Review of Jakob Johann Weyrauch: Grundriss der Wärmetheorie. Mit zahlreichen Beispielen und Anwendungen

| Beiblätter zu den Annalen der Physik, 31, 251 || Thermodynamics.
|-
| Schilpp 21; CP 2, 47; Weil *21 || 1907 || Relativitätsprinzip und die aus demselben gezogenen Folgerungen 

| Jahrbuch der Radioaktivität, 4, 411–462, link ||  Special and general relativity.  A correction appeared in volume 5, pp. 98–99, Berichtigungen.  First appearance (page 443) of the equation E=mc2.  This paper also marks the beginning of Einstein's long development of general relativity; here he derives the equivalence principle, gravitational redshift, and the gravitational bending of light.  Einstein returns to these topics in 1911.
|-
| Schilpp 22; CP 2, 40 || 1907 || Theoretische Bemerkungen über die Brownsche Bewegung 

| Zeitschrift für Elektrochemie und angewandte physikalische Chemie, 13, 41–42 ||  Statistical mechanics.  Brief note on the technical meaning of "average velocity".
|- style="background:#ffddff;"
| Schilpp 23; CP 2, 51 || 1908 || Elektromagnetische Grundgleichungen für bewegte Körper 

| Annalen der Physik (ser. 4), 26, 532–540, link || Special relativity.  Co-authored with J. Laub.  A correction appeared in volume 27, p.232, Berichtigungen.  See also publication #27.
|- style="background:#ffddff;"
| Schilpp 24; CP 2, 52 || 1908 || Die im elektromagnetischen Felde auf ruhende Körper ausgeübten ponderomotorischen Kräfte 

| Annalen der Physik (ser. 4), 26, 541–550, link || Special relativity.  Co-authored with J. Laub.
|-
| Schilpp 25; CP 2, 48 || 1908 || Neue elektrostatische Methode zur Messung kleiner Elektrizitätsmengen 

| Physikalische Zeitschrift, 9, 216–217 ||  Electromagnetism.  Novel experimental method for measuring tiny amounts of charge, by first charging a variable capacitor at low capacitance, then changing it to high capacitance and discharging it to another capacitor.  An apparatus for this amplification was constructed by two brothers, Johann Conrad Habicht and Franz Paul Habicht, in collaboration with Einstein and published in Physikalische Zeitschrift, 11, 532 (1910).
|-
| Schilpp 26; CP 2, 50 || 1908 || Elementare Theorie der Brownschen Bewegung 

| Zeitschrift für Elektrochemie, 14, 235–239 ||  Statistical mechanics.  Semi-popular review.
|- style="background:#ffddff;"
| Schilpp 27; CP 2, 54 || 1909 || Bemerkungen zu unserer Arbeit: Elektromagnetische Grundgleichungen für bewegte Körper 

| Annalen der Physik (ser. 4), 28, 445–447, link || Special relativity.  Co-authored with J. Laub.
|-
| Schilpp 28; CP 2, 55 || 1909 || Bemerkung zur Arbeit von Mirimanoff: Die Grundgleichungen...

| Annalen der Physik (ser. 4), 28, 885–888, link ||  Special relativity.  Notes similarity to Hermann Minkowski's work.
|-
| Schilpp 29; CP 2, 56 || 1909 || Zum gegenwärtigen Stande des Strahlungsproblems 

| Physikalische Zeitschrift, 10, 185–193 || Photons.  Review article on electromagnetic radiation, and an important forerunner of publication #30.
|- style="background:#ffddff;"
| Schilpp 29b; CP 2, 57 || 1909 || No title
| Physikalische Zeitschrift, 10, 323–324 || Photons. Walther Ritz's joint communique with Einstein (co-author) on their differing viewpoints of the advanced and retarded solutions of Maxwell's equations.  Einstein argues that the physical restriction to retarded solutions is not a law, but probabilistic; Ritz states that the same restriction is the basis of the 2nd law of thermodynamics.
|-
| Schilpp 30; CP 2, 60 || 1909 || Entwicklung unserer Anschauungen über das Wesen und die Konstitution der Strahlung 

| Physikalische Zeitschrift, 10, 817–825 || Photons.  Pivotal address before the 81st assembly of the Gesellschaft Deutscher Naturforscher, held in Salzburg, where Einstein showed that photons must carry momentum and should be treated as particles.  Notes that electromagnetic radiation must have a dual nature, at once both wave-like and particulate.  Also published in the journal Deutsche physikalische Gesellschaft, Verhandlungen, 11, pp. 482–500.  An English translation is available at the English Wikisource.
|- style="background:#ffddff;"
| Schilpp 31; CP 3, 7 || 1910 || Über einen Satz der Wahrscheinlichkeitsrechnung und seine Anwendung in der Strahlungstheorie 

| Annalen der Physik (ser. 4), 33, 1096–1104, link ||  Photons.  Co-authored with L. Hopf.  See also publication #79.
|- style="background:#ffddff;"
| Schilpp 32; CP 3, 8 || 1910 || Statistische Untersuchung der Bewegung eines Resonators in einem Strahlungsfeld 

| Annalen der Physik (ser. 4), 33, 1105–1115, link || Photons.  Co-authored with L. Hopf.
|-
| Schilpp 33; CP 3, 9; Weil *36 || 1910 || Theorie der Opaleszenz von homogenen Flüssigkeiten und Flüssigkeitsgemischen in der Nähe des kritischen Zustandes 

| Annalen der Physik (ser. 4), 33, 1275–1298, link ||  Statistical mechanics.  Seminal paper on critical opalescence.
|-
| Schilpp 34; CP 3, 2 || 1910 || Principe de relativité et ses conséquences dans la physique moderne 

| Archives des sciences physiques et naturelles (ser. 4), 29, 5–28, 125–244 ||  Special relativity.  Translation by E. Guillaume, but does not correspond to reference #21.
|-
| Schilpp 35; CP 3, 5 || 1910 || Théorie des quantités lumineuses et la question de la localisation de l'énergie électromagnetique 

| Archives des sciences physiques et naturelles (ser. 4),  29, 525–528 || Photons.
|-
| Schilpp 36; CP 3, 6 || 1910 || Forces pondéromotrices qui agissent sur les conducteurs ferromagnétiques disposés dans un champs magnétique et parcourus par un courant 

| Archives des sciences physiques et naturelles (ser. 4),  30, 323–324 ||  Electromagnetism.
|-
| Schilpp 37; CP 3, 12 || 1911 || Bemerkung zu dem Gesetz von Eötvös 

| Annalen der Physik (ser. 4), 34, 165–169, link ||  Intermolecular forces and fluid mechanics.
|-
| Schilpp 38; CP 3, 13; Weil *39 || 1911 || Beziehung zwischen dem elastischen Verhalten und der Spezifischen Wärme mit einatomigem Molekül 

| Annalen der Physik (ser. 4), 34, 170–174, link || Specific heats.  Einstein tries to connect a characteristic frequency in his 1907 theory of specific heats to the elastic properties of the solid.  See also Bemerkung zu meiner Arbeit: 'Eine Beziehung zwischen dem elastischen Verhalten ...'", p. 590.
|-
| Schilpp 39; CP 3, 10 || 1911 || Bemerkungen zu den P. Hertzschen Arbeiten: Mechanische Grundlagen der Thermodynamik 

| Annalen der Physik (ser. 4), 34, 175–176, link || Statistical mechanics.
|-
| Schilpp 40; CP 3, 14 || 1911 || Berichtigung zu meiner Arbeit: Eine neue Bestimmung der Moleküldimensionen 

| Annalen der Physik (ser. 4), 34, 591–592, link ||  Statistical mechanics.  Correction to publication #11 that produces an excellent estimate of the Avogadro constant.
|-
| Schilpp 41; CP 3, 21 || 1911 || Elementare Betrachtungen über die thermische Molekularbewegung in festen Körpern 

| Annalen der Physik (ser. 4), 35, 679–694, link || Specific heats.  Recognizing that his 1907 model of specific heats is incorrect at very low temperatures, Einstein tries to improve it.  The correct answer came a year later with the Debye model.
|-
| Schilpp 42; CP 3, 23; Weil *43 || 1911 || Einfluss der Schwerkraft auf die Ausbreitung des Lichtes 

| Annalen der Physik (ser. 4), 35, 898–908, link ||  General relativity.  In this paper, Einstein resumes his development of general relativity, last discussed in 1907.  Here, Einstein realizes that a new theory is needed to replace both special relativity and Newton's theory of gravitation.  He also realizes that special relativity and the equivalence principle hold locally, not globally.
|-
| Schilpp 43; CP 3, 17 || 1911 || Relativitätstheorie 

| Naturforschende Gesellschaft, Zürich, Vierteljahresschrift, 56, 1–14 ||  Special and (possibly) general relativity.  An address given at the conference of the Zurich Society of Scientists.
|-
| Schilpp 44; CP 3, 22 || 1911 || Zum Ehrenfestschen Paradoxon 

| Physikalische Zeitschrift, 12, 509–510 || Special relativity.  Clears up confusion about the Lorentz contraction.
|-
| Schilpp 45; CP 4, 2 and 5 || 1912 || Thermodynamische Begründung des photochemischen Äquivalentgesetzes 

| Annalen der Physik (ser. 4), 37, 832–838, link || Statistical mechanics.  See also volume 38, pp. 881–884, Nachtrag zu meiner Arbeit: 'Thermodynamische Begründung des photochemischen Äquivalentgesetzes'
|-
| Schilpp 46; CP 4, 3 || 1912 || Lichtgeschwindigkeit und Statik des Gravitationsfeldes 

| Annalen der Physik (ser. 4), 38, 355–369, link ||  General relativity.  First of two papers (see next entry for second) in the continuing development of general relativity (see reference #42).  These two papers are the last in which Einstein allows time to be warped while keeping space flat (uncurved).  In these papers, he realizes that the Lorentz transformations of special relativity must be generalized and that the new theory of gravitation must be non-linear, since gravitational energy can itself gravitate. 
|-
| Schilpp 47; CP 4, 4 || 1912 || Theorie des statischen Gravitationsfeldes 

| Annalen der Physik (ser. 4), 38, 443–458, link ||  General relativity.  Second of two papers (see previous entry for first) in the continuing development of general relativity.
|-
| Schilpp 48; CP 4, 6 || 1912 || Antwort auf eine Bemerkung von J. Stark: Anwendung des Planckschen Elementargesetzes 

| Annalen der Physik (ser. 4), 38, 888, link ||  Photons.
|-
| Schilpp 49; CP 4, 8 || 1912 || Relativität und Gravitation: Erwiderung auf eine Bemerkung von M. Abraham 

| Annalen der Physik (ser. 4), 38, 1059–1064, link ||  General relativity.
|-
| Schilpp 50; CP 4, 9 || 1912 || Bemerkung zu Abraham's vorangehender Auseinandersetzung: Nochmals Relativität und Gravitation 

| Annalen der Physik (ser. 4), 39, 704, link ||  General relativity.
|-
| Schilpp 52; CP 4, 7 || 1912 || Gibt es eine Gravitationswirkung die der elektromagnetischen Induktionswirkung analog ist? 

| Vierteljahrschrift für gerichtliche Medizin (ser. 3), 44, 37–40 ||  General relativity.
|- style="background:#ffddff;"
| Schilpp 53; CP 4, 13; Weil *58 || 1913 || Entwurf einer verallgemeinerten Relativitätstheorie und eine Theorie der Gravitation. I. Physikalischer Teil von A. Einstein II. Mathematischer Teil von M. Grossmann 

| Zeitschrift für Mathematik und Physik, 62, 225–244, 245–261 ||  General relativity.  A breakthrough paper, written in collaboration with Marcel Grossmann, in which the single Newtonian scalar gravitational field is replaced by ten fields, which are the components of a symmetric, four-dimensional metric tensor.  However, the correct equations describing these fields are not identified.  Reviewed critically in reference #68.  See also references #21, 42, 46 and 47.
|- style="background:#ffddff;"
| Schilpp 54; CP 4, 11 || 1913 || Einige Argumente für die Annahme einer molekular Agitation beim absoluten Nullpunkt 

| Annalen der Physik (ser. 4), 40, 551–560, link ||  Specific heats.  Co-authored with O. Stern.  Einstein and Stern attempt to explain the specific heats of diatomic gases, such as molecular hydrogen, H2.  Although qualitatively correct, they are quantitatively inaccurate.
|-
| Schilpp 55; CP 4, 12 || 1913 || Déduction thermodynamique de la loi de l'équivalence photochimique 

| Journal de physique (ser. 5), 3, 277–282 || Statistical mechanics.  Not a translation of reference #45, but rather an address before the Société Française de Physique, held on March 27, 1913.
|-
| Schilpp 56; CP 4, 16 || 1913 || Physikalische Grundlagen einer Gravitationstheorie 

| Naturforschende Gesellschaft, Zürich, Vierteljahrsschrift, 58, 284–290 || General relativity.  Address before the Swiss Society of Scientists on September 9, 1913.  A résumé is printed in the Schweizerische naturforschende Gesellschaft, Verhandlungen, 1913 (part 2), pp. 137–138.
|-
| Schilpp 57; CP 4, 23 || 1913 || Max Planck als Forscher 

| Naturwissenschaften, 1, 1077–1079 || History of physics.
|-
| Schilpp 58; CP 4, 17 || 1913 || Zum gegenwärtigen Stande des Gravitationsproblems 

| Physikalische Zeitschrift, 14, 1249–1266 || General relativity.  Address on September 21, 1913 to the 85th Versammlung Deutscher Naturforscher in Vienna.  The discussion following Einstein's address is included in this citation.  This review was also published in the Gesellschaft deutscher Naturforscher und Ärzte, Verhandlungen, 1914, pp. 3–24.  A referat was also published in the journal Himmel und Erde, 26, pp. 90–93.
|- style="background:#ffddff;"
| Schilpp 59; CP 4, 28 || 1914 || Nordströmsche Gravitationstheorie vom Standpunkt des absoluten Differentialkalküls 

| Annalen der Physik (ser. 4), 44, 321–328, link ||  General relativity.  Co-authored with A. D. Fokker.  Shows that the competing field theory of Gunnar Nordström could be recast as a special case of the Einstein-Grossmann equations (see reference #53).
|-
| Schilpp 60 || 1914 || Bases physiques d'une théorie de la gravitation 

| Archives des sciences physiques et naturelles (ser. 4), 37, 5–12 || General relativity.  Translated by E. Guillaume.
|-
| Schilpp 61 || 1914 || Bemerkung zu P. Harzers Abhandlung: Die Mitführung des Lichtes in Glas und die Aberration 

| Astronomische Nachrichten, 199, 8–10, link ||  Electromagnetism and special relativity.
|-
| Schilpp 62 || 1914 || Antwort auf eine Replik P. Harzers 

| Astronomische Nachrichten, 199, 47–48, link || Electromagnetism and special relativity.
|-
| Schilpp 63 || 1914 || Zum gegenwärtigen Stande des Problems der spezifischen Wärme 

| Deutsche Bunsengesellschaft, Abhandlungen, 7, 330–364 || Specific heats. German edition of reference #51; pages 353–364 include the discussion following Einstein's address.
|-
| Schilpp 64; CP 6, 5 || 1914 || Beiträge zur Quantentheorie 

| Deutsche physikalische Gesellschaft, Berichte, 1914, 820–828 || Quantum mechanics.  Reprinted in volume 16 of the Verhandlungen of the same society.
|-
| Schilpp 65; CP 4, 27 || 1914 || Zur Theorie der Gravitation 

| Naturforschende Gesellschaft, Zürich, Vierteljahrsschrift, 59, 4–6 || General relativity.
|-
| Schilpp 66 || 1914 || Review of H. A. Lorentz: Das Relativitätsprinzip 

| Naturwissenschaften, 2, 1018 || Special and (possibly) general relativity.
|-
| Schilpp 67; CP 4, 24 || 1914 || Nachträgliche Antwort auf eine Frage von Reissner 

| Physikalische Zeitschrift, 15, 108–110 || General relativity.  Concerns the mass of a gravitational field itself.
|-
| Schilpp 68; CP 4, 25 || 1914 || Principielles zur verallgemeinerten Relativitätstheorie und Gravitationstheorie 

| Physikalische Zeitschrift, 15, 176–180 || General relativity.  Reply to Gustav Mie on the relationship between reference #53 and Hermann Minkowski's work.
|-
| Schilpp 69; CP 6, 3 || 1914 || Antrittsrede 

| Sitzungsberichte der Preussischen Akademie der Wissenschaften, 1914 (pt. 2), 739–742 || General relativity.
|-
| Schilpp 70; CP 6, 9 || 1914 || Formale Grundlage der allgemeinen Relativitätstheorie 

| Preussische Akademie der Wissenschaften, Sitzungsberichte, 1914 (part 2), 1030–1085 || General relativity.  An important paper in the development of general relativity.  Einstein still has not derived correct field equations, but he derives the geodesic motion of point particles, relates gravitational fields to rotation, and re-derives his 1907 results about the bending of light and gravitational redshift using the new metric tensor theory.
|-
| Schilpp 71; CP 4, 31 || 1914 || Zum Relativitätsproblem

| Scientia (Bologna), 15, 337–348 link|| Special and (possibly) general relativity.
|-
| Schilpp 72 || 1914 || Physikalische Grundlagen und leitende Gedanken für eine Gravitationstheorie 

| Verhandlungen der Schweizerischen naturforschenden Gesellschaft, 96 (pt. 2), 146 ||  General relativity.  Listed only by title; same lecture as publication #56.
|-
| Schilpp 73 || 1914 || Gravitationstheorie 

| Verhandlungen der Schweizerischen naturforschenden Gesellschaft, 96 (pt. 2), 136–137 ||  General relativity.  For full text, see reference #56.
|-
| Schilpp 74; CP 6, 1 || 1914 April 26 || Relativitätsprinzip 

| Vossische Zeitung, 33–34 ||  Special and (possibly) general relativity.
|- style="background:#ffddff;"
| Schilpp 75; CP 6, 2 || 1914 || Kovarianzeigenschaften der Feldgleichungen der auf die verallgemeinerte Relativitätstheorie gegründeten Gravitationstheorie  

| Zeitschrift für Mathematik und Physik, 63, 215–225 || General relativity.  Co-authored with M. Grossmann.
|- style="background:#ffddff;"
| Schilpp 78 || 1915 || Proefondervindelijk bewijs voor het bestan der moleculaire stroomen von Ampère 

| Akademie van Wetenschappen, Amsterdam, Verslag. (ser. 4), 23, 1449–1464 || Einstein-de Haas effect. Co-authored with WJ de Haas.
|-
| Schilpp 79; CP 6, 18 || 1915 || Antwort auf eine Abhandlung M. von Laues: Ein Satz der Wahrscheinlichkeitsrechnung und seine Anwendung auf die Strahlungstheorie 

| Annalen der Physik (ser. 4), 47, 879–885, link ||  Photons.
|- style="background:#ffddff;"
| Schilpp 80; CP 6, 23; Weil *73 || 1915 || Experimenteller Nachweis des Ampèreschen Molekularströme 

| Verhandlungen der Deutschen Physikalischen Gesellschaft, 17, 152–170, 203 (Berichtigung), 420 ||  Einstein-de Haas effect.  Co-authored with WJ de Haas.
|- style="background:#ffddff;"
| Schilpp 81 || 1915 || Experimenteller Nachweis des Ampèreschen Molekularströme 

| Naturwissenschaften, 3, 237–238 ||  Einstein-de Haas effect.  Co-authored with WJ de Haas.
|-
| Schilpp 82 || 1915 || Grundgedanken der allgemeinen Relativitätstheorie und Anwendung dieser Theorie in der Astronomie 

| Preussische Akademie der Wissenschaften, Sitzungsberichte, 1915 (part 1), 315 ||  General relativity. First of Einstein's four papers in November 1915.
|-
| Schilpp 83; CP 6, 21 and 22 || 1915 || Zur allgemeinen Relativitätstheorie 

| Preussische Akademie der Wissenschaften, Sitzungsberichte, 1915 (part 2), 778–786, 799–801 ||  General relativity.  Second of Einstein's four papers in November 1915 that led to the final field equations for general relativity.  The first paper had corrected a fundamental misconception and had allowed Einstein to finish; however, the second introduced a serious mistake.
|-
| Schilpp 84; CP 6, 24; Weil *76 || 1915 || Erklärung der Perihelbewegung des Merkur aus der allgemeinen Relativitätstheorie 

| Preussische Akademie der Wissenschaften, Sitzungsberichte, 1915 (part 3), 831–839 ||  General relativity.  Third of Einstein's four papers in November 1915. A pivotal paper in which Einstein shows that general relativity explains the anomalous precession of the planet Mercury, which had vexed astronomers since 1859.  This paper also introduced the important calculational method, the post-Newtonian expansion.  Einstein also calculated correctly (for the first time) the bending of light by gravity.
|-
| Schilpp 85; CP 6, 25 || 1915 || Feldgleichungen der Gravitation 

| Preussische Akademie der Wissenschaften, Sitzungsberichte, 1915 (part 4), 844–847 ||  General relativity.  Fourth of Einstein's four papers in November 1915. This is the defining paper of general relativity. At long last, Einstein had found workable field equations, which served as the basis for subsequent derivations.
|- style="background:#ffddff;"
| Schilpp 88; CP 6, 14 || 1916 || Experimental proof of the existence of Ampère's molecular currents || Proceedings of the Akademie van Wetenschappen, Amsterdam, 18, 696–711,link || Einstein-de Haas effect.  Co-authored with WJ de Haas; English translation of reference #80.
|-
| Schilpp 89; CP 6, 30; Weil *80 || 1916 || Grundlage der allgemeinen Relativitätstheorie 

| Annalen der Physik (ser. 4), 49, 769–822, link ||  General relativity. Final consolidation by Einstein of his various papers on the subject - in particular, his four papers in November 1915.
|-
| Schilpp 90; CP 6, 40 || 1916 || Über Fr. Kottlers Abhandlung: Einsteins Äquivalenzhypothese und die Gravitation 

| Annalen der Physik (ser. 4), 51, 639–642, link || General relativity.
|-
| Schilpp 91; CP 6, 28 || 1916 || Einfaches Experiment zum Nachweis der Ampèreschen Molekularströme 

| Verhandlungen der Deutschen Physikalischen Gesellschaft, 18, 173–177 ||  Einstein-de Haas effect.
|-
| Schilpp 92; CP 6, 34; Weil *85 || 1916 || Strahlungs-emission und -absorption nach der Quantentheorie 

| Verhandlungen der Deutschen Physikalischen Gesellschaft, 18, 318–323 ||  Photons.  Seminal paper in which Einstein showed that Planck's quantum hypothesis E=hν could be derived from a kinetic rate equation.  This paper introduced the idea of stimulated emission (which led to the laser and maser), and Einstein's A and B coefficients provided a guide for the development of quantum electrodynamics, the most accurately tested theory of physics at present.  In this work, Einstein begins to realize that quantum mechanics seems to involve probabilities and a breakdown of causality.
|-
| Schilpp 93; CP 6, 38 || 1916 || Quantentheorie der Strahlung 

| Mitteilungen der Physikalischen Gesellschaft, Zürich, 16, 47–62 ||  Photons.  Following his 1909 address (reference #30), Einstein shows that photons must carry momentum if Planck's law is to hold.  This was confirmed in 1923 by Compton scattering, for which the 1927 Nobel Prize in Physics was awarded and which led to the general acceptance to the photon concept.
|-
| Schilpp 94; CP 6, 36 || 1916 || Review of H. A. Lorentz: Théories statistiques en thermodynamique 

| Naturwissenschaften, 4, 480–481 ||  Statistical mechanics.
|-
| Schilpp 95; CP 6, 39 || 1916 || Elementare Theorie der Wasserwellen und des Fluges 

| Naturwissenschaften, 4, 509–510 || Fluid mechanics.
|-
| Schilpp 96; CP 6, 29 || 1916 || Ernst Mach || Physikalische Zeitschrift, 17, 101–104 ||  History of physics.
|-
| Schilpp 97; CP 6, 27 || 1916 || Neue formale Deutung der Maxwellschen Feldgleichungen der Elektrodynamik 

| Preussische Akademie der Wissenschaften, Sitzungsberichte, 1916 (part 1), 184–187 ||  Electromagnetism.
|-
| Schilpp 98 || 1916 || Einige anschauliche Überlegungen aus dem Gebiete der Relativitätstheorie 

| Preussische Akademie der Wissenschaften, Sitzungsberichte, 1916 (part 1), 423 ||  General relativity.  Abstract of a paper (never published) dealing with the behavior of clocks and Foucault pendulums.
|-
| Schilpp 99; CP 6, 32 || 1916 || Näherungsweise Integration der Feldgleichungen der Gravitation 

| Preussische Akademie der Wissenschaften, Sitzungsberichte, 1916 (part 1), 688–696 || General relativity The first prediction of gravitational waves.  Such gravitational radiation has been observed indirectly, for which the 1993 Nobel Prize in Physics was awarded, and observed directly, on Earth, in 2015.
|-
| Schilpp 100 || 1916 || Gedächtnisrede auf Karl Schwarzschild 

| Preussische Akademie der Wissenschaften, Sitzungsberichte, 1916 (part 1), 768–770 || History of physics.
|-
| Schilpp 101; CP 6, 41 || 1916 || Hamiltonsches Prinzip und allgemeine Relativitätstheorie 

| Preussische Akademie der Wissenschaften, Sitzungsberichte, 1916 (part 2), 1111–1116 || General relativity.
|-
| Schilpp 103; CP 6, 45 || 1917 || Zum Quantensatz von Sommerfeld und Epstein 

| Deutsche Physikalische Gesellschaft, Verhandlungen, 19, 82–92 || Quantum mechanics.  Seminal paper for the Einstein–Brillouin–Keller method, which describes how to convert a classical system into its quantum mechanical analogue.
|-
| Schilpp 104 || 1917 || Review of H. v. Helmholtz: Zwei Vorträge über Goethe 

| Naturwissenschaften, 5, 675 ||  History of physics.
|-
| Schilpp 105 || 1917 || Marian von Smoluchowski || Naturwissenschaften, 5, 737–738 ||  History of physics.
|-
| Schilpp 106; Weil *91 || 1917 || Zur Quantentheorie der Strahlung 

| Physikalische Zeitschrift, 18, 121–128 ||  Photons.
|-
| Schilpp 107; CP 6, 43 || 1917 || Kosmologische Betrachtungen zur allgemeinen Relativitätstheorie 

| Preussische Akademie der Wissenschaften, Sitzungsberichte, 1917 (part 1), 142–152 ||  General relativity.  This seminal paper marks the beginning of physical cosmology.  Under certain simplifying assumptions, general relativity describes the birth, the expansion and the ultimate fate of the Universe.
|-
| Schilpp 108; CP 6, 47 || 1917 || Eine Ableitung des Theorems von Jacobi 

| Preussische Akademie der Wissenschaften, Sitzungsberichte, 1917 (part 2), 606–608 ||  Mathematical physics.
|-
| Schilpp 109 || 1917 May 23 || Friedrich Adler als Physiker 

| Die Vossische Zeitung, Morgen Ausgabe, no. 259, 2 ||  History of physics.
|-
| Schilpp 112; CP 7, 4 || 1918 || Prinzipielles zur allgemeinen Relativitätstheorie 

| Annalen der Physik (ser. 4), 55, 241–244, link ||  General relativity.
|-
| Schilpp 113; CP 7, 6 || 1918 || Lassen sich Brechungsexponenten der Körper für Röntgenstrahlen experimentell ermitteln? 

| Verhandlungen der Deutschen Physikalischen Gesellschaft, 20, 86–87 ||  Electromagnetism.
|-
| Schilpp 114; CP 7, 15 || 1918 || Bemerkung zu Gehrckes Notiz: Über den Äther 

| Verhandlungen der Deutschen Physikalischen Gesellschaft, 20, 261 ||  Special and general relativity.
|-
| Schilpp 115; CP 7, 10 || 1918 || Review of H. Weyl: Raum, Zeit, Materie 

| Naturwissenschaften, 6, 373 || Special and general relativity.
|-
| Schilpp 116; CP 7, 13 || 1918 || Dialog über Einwände gegen die Relativitätstheorie 

| Naturwissenschaften, 6, 697–702 ||  Special and general relativity.
|-
| Schilpp 117; CP 7, 2 || 1918 || Notiz zu Schrödingers Arbeit: Energiekomponenten des Gravitationsfeldes 

| Physikalische Zeitschrift, 19, 115–116 ||  General relativity.
|-
| Schilpp 118; CP 7, 3 || 1918 || Bemerkung zu Schrödingers Notiz: Lösungssystem der allgemein kovarianten Gravitationsgleichungen 

| Physikalische Zeitschrift, 19, 165–166 || General relativity.
|-
| Schilpp 119; CP 7, 1 || 1918 || Gravitationswellen 

| Preussische Akademie der Wissenschaften, Sitzungsberichte, 1918 (part 1), 154–167 ||  General relativity. Second paper on Gravitational waves.
|-
| Schilpp 120; CP 7, 5 || 1918 || Kritisches zu einer von Hrn. de Sitter gegebenen Lösung der Gravitationsgleichungen 

| Preussische Akademie der Wissenschaften, Sitzungsberichte, 1918 (part 1), 270–272 ||  General relativity.
|-
| Schilpp 121; CP 7, 9 || 1918 || Der Energiesatz in der allgemeinen Relativitätstheorie 

| Preussische Akademie der Wissenschaften, Sitzungsberichte, 1918 (part 1), 448–459 ||  General relativity.
|-
| Schilpp 122 || 1919 || Prüfung der allgemeinen Relativitätstheorie 

| Naturwissenschaften, 7, 776 ||  General relativity.
|-
| Schilpp 123; CP 7, 17 || 1919 || Spielen Gravitationsfelder im Aufbau der materiellen Elementarteilchen eine wesentliche Rolle? 

| Sitzungsberichte der Preussischen Akademie der Wissenschaften, 1919 (pt. 1), 349–356 ||  General relativity.  Suggests a modification of his field equations to allow for stable elementary particles.
|-
| Schilpp 124; CP 7, 18 || 1919 || Bemerkungen über periodische Schwankungen der Mondlänge, welche bisher nach der Newtonschen Mechanik nicht erklärbar schienen 

| Sitzungsberichte der Preussischen Akademie der Wissenschaften, 1919 (pt. 1), 433–436 ||  General relativity.
|-
| Schilpp 125 || 1919 || Feldgleichungen der allgemeinen Relativitätstheorie vom Standpunkte des kosmologischen Problems und des Problems der Konstitution der Materie 

| Sitzungsberichte der Preussischen Akademie der Wissenschaften, 1919 (pt. 1), 463 (Title only) ||  General relativity.
|-
| Schilpp 126; CP 7, 26 || 1919 November 28 || My theory || Times, London, 13 ||  General relativity.  Re-published in 1919 as "Time, space and gravitation" in Optician, the British optical journal, volume 58, pages 187–188.
|-
| Schilpp 127; CP 7, 24 || 1919 || Leo Arons als Physiker 

| Sozialistische Monatshefte, 52 (Jahrgang 25, pt. 2), 1055–1056 ||  History of physics.
|-
| Schilpp 132 || 1920 || Bemerkung zur Abhandlung von W. R. Hess: Theorie der Viscosität heterogener Systeme 

| Kolloidzeitschrift, 27, 137 ||  Intermolecular forces.
|-
| Schilpp 133; CP 7, 49
| 1920 || Ernst Reichenbächer: Inwiefern lässt sich die moderne Gravitationstheorie ohne die Relativität begründen? 

Einstein: Antwort auf vorstehende Betrachtung

| Naturwissenschaften, 8, 1010–1011 ||  General relativity.
|-
| Schilpp 134 || 1920 || Trägheitsmoment des Wasserstoffmoleküls 

| Sitzungsberichte der Preussischen Akademie der Wissenschaften, 1920, 65 ||  Intermolecular forces.  Abstract of never-published paper.
|-
| Schilpp 135; CP 7, 39 || 1920 || Schallausbreitung in teilweise dissoziierten Gasen 

| Sitzungsberichte der Preussischen Akademie der Wissenschaften, 1920, 380–385 ||  Intermolecular forces.  Notes on the page proofs with corrections.
|-
| Schilpp 136; CP 7, 45 || 1920 August 27 || Meine Antwort über die antirelativitätstheoretische G.m.b.H.

| Berliner Tageblatt und Handelszeitung, no. 402, 1–2 ||  Special and general relativity.
|-
| Schilpp 147; CP 7, 53 || 1921 || A brief outline of the development of the theory of relativity || Nature, 106, 782–784 || History of physics.  Translated by R. W. Lawson.
|-
| Schilpp 148 || 1921 || Geometrie und Erfahrung 

| Sitzungsberichte der Preussischen Akademie der Wissenschaften, 1921 (pt. 1), 123–130 || General relativity.
|-
| Schilpp 149; CP 7, 54 || 1921 || Eine naheliegende Ergänzung des Fundaments der allgemeinen Relativitätstheorie 

| Sitzungsberichte der Preussischen Akademie der Wissenschaften, 1921 (pt. 1), 261–264 || General relativity.
|-
| Schilpp 150; CP 7, 68 || 1921 || Ein den Elementarprozess der Lichtemission betreffendes Experiment 

| Sitzungsberichte der Preussischen Akademie der Wissenschaften, 1921 (pt. 2), 882–883 ||  Photons.
|-
| Schilpp 151 || 1921 || Report of a lecture at King's College on the development and present position of relativity, with quotations || Nation and Athenaeum, 29, 431–432 ||  Special and general relativity.  The German text is reproduced in Mein Weltbild (pp. 215–220); a full translation is found in The World as I See It.  It was also reported in Nature (107, p. 504) and also in the Times (London) on June 14, p. 8.
|-
| Schilpp 159 || 1922 || Bemerkung zur Seletyschen Arbeit: Beiträge zum kosmologischen Problem 

| Annalen der Physik (ser. 4), 69, 436–438, link ||  General relativity.
|-
| Schilpp 160 || 1922 || Review of W. Pauli: Relativitätstheorie 

| Naturwissenschaften, 10, 184–185 ||  Special and general relativity.
|-
| Schilpp 161 || 1922 || Emil Warburg als Forscher 

| Naturwissenschaften, 10, 823–828 ||  History of physics.
|-
| Schilpp 162 || 1922 || Theorie der Lichtfortpflanzung in dispergierenden Medien 

| Sitzungsberichte der Preussischen Akademie der Wissenschaften, Phys.-math. Klasse, 1922, 18–22 ||  Electromagnetism.
|-
| Schilpp 163 || 1922 || Bemerkung zu der Abhandlung von E. Trefftz: Statische Gravitationsfeld zweier Massenpunkte 

| Sitzungsberichte der Preussischen Akademie der Wissenschaften, Phys.-math. Klasse, 1922, 448–449 ||  General relativity.
|- style="background:#ffddff;"
| Schilpp 164 || 1922 || Quantentheoretische Bemerkungen zum Experiment von Stern und Gerlach 

| Zeitschrift für Physik, 11, 31–34 || Quantum mechanics.  Co-authored with Paul Ehrenfest.
|-
| Schilpp 165 || 1922 || Bemerkung zu der Arbeit von A. Friedmann: Über die Krümmung des Raumes 

| Zeitschrift für Physik, 11, 326 || General relativity.  Einstein withdrew this self-criticism in 1922 in the same journal Zeitschrift für Physik, volume 16, p. 228.
|-
| Schilpp 170 || 1923 || Bemerkung zu der Notiz von W. Anderson: Neue Erklärung des kontinuierlichen Koronaspektrums 

| Astronomische Nachrichten, 219, 19 ||  Solar physics.
|- style="background:#ffddff;"
| Schilpp 171 || 1923 || Experimentelle Bestimmung der Kanalweite von Filtern 

| Deutsche medizinische Wochenschrift, 49, 1012–1013 ||  Fluid mechanics.  Co-authored with H. Mühsam.
|- style="background:#ffddff;"
| Schilpp 172 || 1923 || Beweis der Nichtexistenz eines überall regulären zentrisch symmetrischen Feldes nach der Feldtheorie von Kaluza 

| Jerusalem University, Scripta, 1  (no. 7), 1–5 || Classical unified field theories.  Co-authored with J. Grommer; also given in Hebrew.
|-
| Schilpp 173 || 1923 || Theory of the affine field || Nature, 112, 448–449 || Classical unified field theories.  Translated by RW Lawson, but does not correspond to publication #175.  Relatively non-mathematical.
|-
| Schilpp 174 || 1923 || Zur allgemeinen Relativitätstheorie 

| Sitzungsberichte der Preussischen Akademie der Wissenschaften, Physikalisch-mathematische Klasse, 1923, 32–38, 76–77 ||  General relativity.
|-
| Schilpp 175; Weil *132 || 1923 || Zur affinen Feldtheorie 

| Sitzungsberichte der Preussischen Akademie der Wissenschaften, Physikalisch-mathematische Klasse, 1923, 137–140 ||  Classical unified field theories.
|-
| Schilpp 176 || 1923 || Bietet die Feldtheorie Möglichkeiten für die Lösung des Quantenproblems? 

| Sitzungsberichte der Preussischen Akademie der Wissenschaften, Physikalisch-mathematische Klasse, 1923, 359–364 ||  Classical unified field theories.
|-
| Schilpp 177 || 1923 || Théorie de relativité 

| Société française de philosophie, Bulletin, 22, 97–98, 101, 107, 111–112 || Special and general relativity.  Quoted in full in Nature, 112, p. 253.
|- style="background:#ffddff;"
| Schilpp 178 || 1923 || Quantentheorie des Strahlungsgleichgewichts 

| Zeitschrift für Physik, 19, 301–306 ||  Photons.  Co-authored with Paul Ehrenfest.
|-
| Schilpp 181 || 1924 || Antwort auf eine Bemerkung von W. Anderson 

| Astronomische Nachrichten, 221, 329–330 ||  
|-
| Schilpp 182 || 1924 April 20 || Komptonsche Experiment 

| Berliner Tageblatt, 1. Beiblatt || Photons.  Experiment showing that photons could carry momentum; for many physicists, this experiment was conclusive proof that photons were particles.
|-
| Schilpp 184 || 1924 || Zum hundertjährigen Gedenktag von Lord Kelvins Geburt 

| Naturwissenschaften, 12, 601–602 || History of physics.
|-
| Schilpp 185; Weil *142 || 1924 || Quantentheorie des einatomigen idealen Gases 

| Sitzungsberichte der Preussischen Akademie der Wissenschaften, Physikalisch-mathematische Klasse, 1924, 261–267 ||  Photons and statistical mechanics.  First of two seminal papers (see reference #194), in which Einstein creates the theory of identical particles in quantum mechanics.  In 1924, Satyendra Nath Bose derived Planck's law of black-body radiation from a modification of coarse-grained counting of phase space. Einstein shows that this modification is equivalent to assuming that photons are rigorously identical, leading to the concept of coherent states.  Einstein also extends Bose's formalism to material particles (bosons), predicting that they condense at sufficiently low temperatures, as verified experimentally.
|-
| Schilpp 186 || 1924 || Über den Äther 

| Verhandlungen der Schweizerischen naturforschenden Gesellschaft, 105 (pt. 2), 85–93 || History of physics.  Historical overview.
|-
| Schilpp 187 || 1924 || Theorie der Radiometerkräfte 

| Zeitschrift für Physik, 27, 1–6 ||  Statistical mechanics. Treatment of the physics of radiometers, a science toy.
|-
| Schilpp 188 || 1924 || [Note appended to a paper by Bose entitled "Wärmegleichgewicht im Strahlungsfeld bei Anwesenheit von Materie"]

| Zeitschrift für Physik, 27, 392–392 ||  Photons.
|-
| Schilpp 193 || 1925 || Elektron und allgemeine Relativitätstheorie 

| Physica, 5, 330–334 ||  General relativity.
|-
| Schilpp 194; Weil *144 || 1925 || Quantentheorie des einatomigen idealen Gases. 2. Abhandlung 

| Sitzungsberichte der Preussischen Akademie der Wissenschaften (Berlin), Physikalisch-mathematische Klasse, 1925, 3–14 ||  Photons and statistical mechanics.  Second of two seminal articles on identical particles, bosons and Bose–Einstein condensation; see reference #185 for the first.
|-
| Schilpp 195 || 1925 || Quantentheorie des idealen Gases 

| Sitzungsberichte der Preussischen Akademie der Wissenschaften (Berlin), Physikalisch-mathematische Klasse, 1925, 18–25 ||  Photons and statistical mechanics.
|-
| Schilpp 196 || 1925 || Einheitliche Feldtheorie von Gravitation und Elektrizität 

| Sitzungsberichte der Preussischen Akademie der Wissenschaften (Berlin), Physikalisch-mathematische Klasse, 1925, 414–419 ||  Classical unified field theories.
|-
| Schilpp 197 || 1925 || Bemerkung zu P. Jordans Abhandlung: Theorie der Quantenstrahlung 

| Zeitschrift für Physik, 31, 784–785 ||  Photons.
|-
| Schilpp 199 || 1926 || W. H. Julius, 1860–1925 ||Astrophysical Journal, 63, 196–198 ||  History of physics.
|-
| Schilpp 200 || 1926 || Ursache der Mäanderbildung der Flussläufe und des sogenannten Baerschen Gesetzes 

| Naturwissenschaften, 14, 223–224 ||  Earth science.  The physics of meandering rivers.
|-
| Schilpp 201 || 1926 || Vorschlag zu einem die Natur des elementaren Strahlungs-emissions-prozesses betreffenden Experiment 

| Naturwissenschaften, 14, 300–301 || Photons.
|-
| Schilpp 202 || 1926 || Interferenzeigenschaften des durch Kanalstrahlen emittierten Lichtes 

| Sitzungsberichte der Preussischen Akademie der Wissenschaften, Physikalisch-mathematische Klasse, 1926, 334–340 || Photons.  Supposedly verified experimentally by Rupp in the paper following it in the journal (pp. 341–351); later, it came out that Rupp was a fraud.
|-
| Schilpp 203 || 1926 || Geometría no euclídea y física 

| Revista matemática Hispano-americana (ser. 2), 1, 72–76 || General relativity.
|-
| Schilpp 205 || 1927 || Einfluss der Erdbewegung auf die Lichtgeschwindigkeit relativ zur Erde 

| Forschungen und Fortschritte, 3, 36–37 || Special relativity.
|-
| Schilpp 206 || 1927 || Formale Beziehung des Riemannschen Krümmungstensors zu den Feldgleichungen der Gravitation 

| Mathematische Annalen, 97, 99–103 link ||  General relativity.
|-
| Schilpp 207 || 1927 || Isaac Newton ||Manchester Guardian Weekly, 16, 234–235 || History of physics. Reprinted in the Manchester Guardian (March 19, 1927); Observatory, 50, 146–153; Smithsonian Institution, Report for 1927, 201–207.
|-
| Schilpp 208 || 1927 || Newtons Mechanik und ihr Einfluss auf die Gestaltung der theoretischen Physik 

| Naturwissenschaften, 15, 273–276 ||  History of physics.
|-
| Schilpp 209 || 1927 || Zu Newtons 200. Todestage 

| Nord und Süd, Jahrg. 50, 36–40 ||  History of physics.
|-
| Schilpp 210 || 1927 || [Letter to the Royal Society on the occasion of the Newton bicentenary] ||Nature, 119, 467 || History of physics.  Also published in Science, 65, 347–348.
|-
| Schilpp 211 || 1927 || Establishment of an international bureau of meteorology ||Science, 65, 415–417 ||  Meteorology.
|-
| Schilpp 212 || 1927 || Kaluzas Theorie des Zusammenhanges von Gravitation und Elektrizität 

| Sitzungsberichte der Preussischen Akademie der Wissenschaften, Physikalisch-mathematische Klasse, 1927, 23–30 ||  Classical unified field theories.
|- style="background:#ffddff;"
| Schilpp 213 || 1927 || Allgemeine Relativitätstheorie und Bewegungsgesetz 

| Sitzungsberichte der Preussischen Akademie der Wissenschaften, Physikalisch-mathematische Klasse, 1927, 2–13, 235–245 || General relativity.  The first part (pp. 2–13) was co-authored with J. Grommer.
|-
| Schilpp 214 || 1927 || Theoretisches und Experimentelles zur Frage der Lichtentstehung 

| Zeitschrift für angewandte Chemie, 40, 546 ||  Photons.
|-
| Schilpp 216 || 1928 || H. A. Lorentz ||Mathematisch-naturwissenschaftliche Blätter, 22, 24–25 || History of physics.  Abstract of an address given at a memorial service at Leiden University.  Reprinted in Mein Weltbild (The World as I See It), p. 25.
|-
| Schilpp 217 || 1928 || Riemanngeometrie mit Aufrechterhaltung des Begriffes des Fern-Parallelismus 

| Sitzungsberichte der Preussischen Akademie der Wissenschaften, Physikalisch-mathematische Klasse, 1928, 217–221 ||  Classical unified field theories.
|-
| Schilpp 218 || 1928 || Neue Möglichkeit für eine einheitliche Feldtheorie von Gravitation und Elektrizität 

| Sitzungsberichte der Preussischen Akademie der Wissenschaften, Physikalisch-mathematische Klasse, 1928, 224–227 ||  Classical unified field theories.
|-
| Schilpp 219 || 1928 || À propos de "La déduction relativiste" de M. E. Meyerson 

| Revue philosophique de la France, 105, 161–166 ||  Special and general relativity.
|-
| Schilpp 222 || 1929 || Ansprache an Prof. Planck [bei Entgegennahme der Planckmedaille]

| Forschungen und Fortschritte, 5, 248–249 || History of physics.
|-
| Schilpp 223 || 1929 || [Quotation from an interview with (London) Daily Chronicle (January 26, 1929) on the unitary field theory, in advance of publication #226] ||Nature, 123, 175 ||  Classical unified field theories.
|-
| Schilpp 224 || 1929 || [Note appended to a reprinting of Arago's Memorial address on Thomas Young before the French Academy] ||Naturwissenschaften, 17, 363 ||  History of physics.
|-
| Schilpp 225 || 1929 February 4 || The new field theory ||Times (London) ||  Classical unified field theories. Translated by L. L. Whyte.  Reprinted in the Observatory, 52, 82–87, 114–118 (1930).
|-
| Schilpp 226; Weil *165 || 1929 || Einheitliche Feldtheorie 

| Sitzungsberichte der Preussischen Akademie der Wissenschaften, Physikalisch-mathematische Klasse, 1929, 2–7 ||  Classical unified field theories.
|-
| Schilpp 227 || 1929 || Einheitliche Feldtheorie und Hamiltonsches Prinzip 

| Sitzungsberichte der Preussischen Akademie der Wissenschaften, Physikalisch-mathematische Klasse, 1929, 156–159 ||  Classical unified field theories.
|- style="background:#ffddff;"
| Schilpp 228 || 1929 || Sur la théorie synthéthique des champs 

| Revue générale de l'électricité, 25, 35–39 || Classical unified field theories. Co-authored with Théophile de Donder.
|-
| Schilpp 229 || 1929 || Appreciation of Simon Newcomb ||Science, 69, 249 || History of physics.  Translation of a letter to Newcomb's daughter dated July 15, 1926.
|-
| Schilpp 230 || 1929 || Sesión especial de la Academia (16 abril 1925) 

| Sociedad científica Argentina, Anales, 107, 337–347 || Special and general relativity.  Einstein's discussions with RG Loyarte on mass-energy equivalence and with H Damianovich on the relevance of relativity for a proposed "chemical field".
|-
| Schilpp 232 || 1930 November 9 || Über Kepler 

| Frankfurter Zeitung, p. 16, col. 3–4 || History of physics.  The text is reprinted in Mein Weltbild and its English translation The World as I See It (in German and English, respectively).
|-
| Schilpp 233 || 1930 || Raum-, Feld- und Äther-problem in der Physik 

| World power conference, 2nd, Berlin, 1930. Transactions, 19, 1–5 || Special and general relativity. A widely reported address, e.g., in Dinglers polytechnisches journal, 345, p. 122.
|-
| Schilpp 234 || 1930 || Raum, Äther und Feld in der Physik 

| Forum Philosophicum, 1, 173–180 || Special and general relativity.  An English translation by ES Brightman was provided in the same volume, pp. 180–184.  Similar to #233, but different from the article "Das Raum-, Äther-, und Feld-problem der Physik" reprinted in Mein Weltbild (The World as I See It), pp. 229–248.
|-
| Schilpp 235 || 1930 || Théorie unitaire du champ physique 

| Annales de l'Institut H. Poincaré, 1, 1–24 || Classical unified field theories.
|-
| Schilpp 236 || 1930 || Auf die Riemann-Metrik und den Fern-Parallelismus gegründete einheitliche Feldtheorie 

| Mathematische Annalen, 102, 685–697 link || Classical unified field theories.
|-
| Schilpp 237 || 1930 || Das Raum-Zeit Problem 

| Die Koralle, 5, 486–488 || Special and general relativity.
|-
| Schilpp 238 || 1930 || Review of S. Weinberg: Erkenntnistheorie 

| Naturwissenschaften, 18, 536 ||  History of physics.
|-
| Schilpp 239 || 1930 || Kompatibilität der Feldgleichungen in der einheitlichen Feldtheorie 

| Sitzungsberichte der Preussischen Akademie der Wissenschaften, Physikalisch-mathematische Klasse, 1930, 18–23 ||  Classical unified field theories.
|- style="background:#ffddff;"
| Schilpp 240 || 1930 || Zwei strenge statische Lösungen der Feldgleichungen der einheitlichen Feldtheorie 

| Sitzungsberichte der Preussischen Akademie der Wissenschaften, Physikalisch-mathematische Klasse, 1930, 110–120 || Classical unified field theories.  Co-authored with W. Mayer.
|-
| Schilpp 241 || 1930 || Theorie der Räume mit Riemannmetrik und Fernparallelismus 

| Sitzungsberichte der Preussischen Akademie der Wissenschaften, Physikalisch-mathematische Klasse, 1930, 401–402 ||  Classical unified field theories.
|-
| Schilpp 242 || 1930 || Address at University of Nottingham ||Science, 71, 608–610 ||  Special and general relativity.  A survey of relativity theory (special and general) and of field theory in general.  A précis of the talk was published in Nature, 125, pp. 897–898, under the title "Concept of space".
|-
| Schilpp 243 || 1930 || Über den gegenwärtigen Stand der allgemeinen Relativitätstheorie 

| Yale University Library, Gazette, 6, 3–6 || General relativity.  An English translation by Prof. Leigh Page of Yale University was provided on pages 7–10.  This was neither a scientific talk nor a typical scientific paper; rather, a Yale graduate convinced Einstein to write the summary by longhand; the manuscript is still housed at Yale.
|-
| Schilpp 247 || 1931 || Theory of Relativity: Its Formal Content and Its Present Problems ||Nature, 127, 765, 790, 826–827 || Special and general relativity. Rhodes lectures delivered at Oxford University in May 1931.
|- style="background:#ffddff;"
| Schilpp 248; Weil *178 || 1931 || Knowledge of past and future in quantum mechanics || Physical Review (ser. 2), 37, 780–781, link || Quantum mechanics.  Co-authored with Richard C. Tolman and Boris Podolsky.
|-
| Schilpp 249 || 1931 || Zum kosmologischen Problem der allgemeinen Relativitätstheorie 

| Sitzungsberichte der Preussischen Akademie der Wissenschaften, Physikalisch-mathematische Klasse, 1931, 235–237 ||  General relativity.  Proposed a "cosmological constant."
|- style="background:#ffddff;"
| Schilpp 250 || 1931 || Systematische Untersuchung über kompatible Feldgleichungen welche in einem Riemannschen Raume mit Fern-Parallelismus gesetzt werden können 

| Sitzungsberichte der Preussischen Akademie der Wissenschaften, Physikalisch-mathematische Klasse, 1931, 257–265 ||  Classical unified field theories.  Co-authored with W. Mayer.
|- style="background:#ffddff;"
| Schilpp 251; Weil *182 || 1931 || Einheitliche Feldtheorie von Gravitation und Elektrizität 

| Sitzungsberichte der Preussischen Akademie der Wissenschaften, Physikalisch-mathematische Klasse, 1931, 541–557 || Classical unified field theories.  Co-authored with W. Mayer.
|-
| Schilpp 252 || 1931 || Thomas Alva Edison, 1847–1931 ||Science, 74, 404–405 || History of physics.
|-
| Schilpp 253 || 1931 || Gravitational and electromagnetic fields [Translation of a preliminary report for the Josiah Macy, Jr. foundation] ||Science, 74, 438–439 || Classical unified field theories.
|-
| Schilpp 254 || 1931 || [Reply to congratulatory addresses at a dinner given by the California Institute of Technology on January 15, 1931] ||Science, 73, 379 ||  History of physics.
|-
| Schilpp 255 || 1931 || Gedenkworte auf Albert A. Michelson 

| Zeitschrift für angewandte Chemie, 44, 658 ||  History of physics.
|- style="background:#ffddff;"
| Schilpp 258 || 1932 || On the relation between the expansion and the mean density of the universe ||Proceedings of the National Academy of Sciences, 18, 213–214 ||  General relativity.  Co-authored with Willem de Sitter.
|-
| Schilpp 259 || 1932 || Zu Dr. Berliners siebzigstem Geburtstag 

| Naturwissenschaften, 20, 913 || History of physics.  Reprinted in Mein Weltbild (The World as I See It), pp. 29–32.
|-
| Schilpp 260 || 1932 || Gegenwärtiger Stand der Relativitätstheorie 

| Die Quelle (now called Paedogogischer Führer), 82, 440–442 || General relativity.
|- style="background:#ffddff;"
| Schilpp 261; Weil *185 || 1932 || Einheitliche Feldtheorie von Gravitation und Elektrizität, 2. Abhandlung 

| Sitzungsberichte der Preussischen Akademie der Wissenschaften, Physikalisch-mathematische Klasse, 1932, 130–137 ||  Classical unified field theories.  Co-authored with W. Mayer.
|- style="background:#ffddff;"
| Schilpp 262 || 1932 || Semi-Vektoren und Spinoren 

| Sitzungsberichte der Preussischen Akademie der Wissenschaften, Physikalisch-mathematische Klasse, 1932, 522–550 ||  Mathematics.  Co-authored with W. Mayer.
|-
| Schilpp 263 || 1932 || Unbestimmtheitsrelation 

| Zeitschrift für angewandte Chemie, 45, 23 ||  Quantum mechanics.
|- style="background:#ffddff;"
| Schilpp 267 || 1933 || Dirac Gleichungen für Semi-Vektoren 

| Akademie van wetenschappen (Amsterdam), Proceedings, 36 (pt. 2), 497–? ||  Quantum mechanics.  Co-authored with W. Mayer.
|- style="background:#ffddff;"
| Schilpp 268 || 1933 || Spaltung der natürlichsten Feldgleichungen für Semi-Vektoren in Spinor-Gleichungen vom Diracschen Typus 

| Akademie van wetenschappen (Amsterdam), Proceedings, 36 (pt. 2), 615–619 || Quantum mechanics.  Co-authored with W. Mayer.
|- style="background:#ffddff;"
| Schilpp 270 || 1934 || Darstellung der Semi-Vektoren als gewöhnliche Vektoren von besonderem Differentiations Charakter 

| Annals of mathematics (ser. 2), 35, 104–110 || Mathematics.  Co-authored with W. Mayer.
|-
| Schilpp 271 || 1934 || Review of R. Tolman: Relativity, thermodynamics and cosmology ||Science, 80, 358 ||  Special and general relativity.
|-
| Schilpp 272 || 1935 || Elementary derivation of the equivalence of mass and energy ||Bulletin of the American Mathematical Society, 41, 223–230, link||  Special relativity.
|- style="background:#ffddff;"
| Schilpp 273; Weil *195 || 1935 || Can quantum-mechanical description of physical reality be considered complete? ||Physical Review (ser. 2), 47, 777–780, link || Quantum mechanics.  Seminal paper on non-local effects (entanglement) in quantum mechanics.  Co-authored with B. Podolsky and N. Rosen.
|- style="background:#ffddff;"
| Schilpp 274 || 1935 || The particle problem in the general theory of relativity ||Physical Review (ser. 2), 48, 73–77 || General relativity.  Co-authored with N. Rosen.
|-
| Schilpp 275 || 1936 || Physik und Realität 

| Franklin Institute, Journal, 221, 313–347 || Quantum mechanics.  An English translation (by J Picard) is provided on pages 349–382.  Also reprinted in Zeitschrift für freie deutsche Forschung, 1, no. 1, pp. 5–19 and no. 2, pp. 1–14 (1938).
|- style="background:#ffddff;"
| Schilpp 276 || 1936 || Two-body problem in general relativity theory ||Physical Review (ser. 2), 49, 404–405 || General relativity.  Co-authored with N. Rosen.
|-
| Schilpp 277 || 1936 || Lens-like action of a star by deviation of light in the gravitational field ||Science, 84, 506–507 ||  General relativity.
|- style="background:#ffddff;"
| Schilpp 278; Weil *200 || 1937 || On gravitational waves ||Journal of the Franklin Institute, 223, 43–54 || General relativity.  Co-authored with N. Rosen.  This important paper established that gravitational waves are possible despite the nonlinear nature of the Einstein field equations.   Einstein and Rosen originally reached the opposite conclusion.
|- style="background:#ffddff;"
| Schilpp 283; Weil *202 || 1938 || Gravitational equations and the problems of motion ||Annals of Mathematics (ser. 2),  39, 65–100 || General relativity.  Co-authored with L. Infeld and B. Hoffmann.
|- style="background:#ffddff;"
| Schilpp 284 || 1938 || Generalization of Kaluza's theory of electricity ||Annals of mathematics (ser. 2), 39, 683–701 ||  Classical unified field theories.  Co-authored with P. Bergmann.
|-
| Schilpp 285; Weil *204 || 1939 || Stationary system with spherical symmetry consisting of many gravitating masses ||Annals of Mathematics (ser. 2), 40, 922–936 ||  General relativity.
|- style="background:#ffddff;"
| Schilpp 286; Weil *205 || 1940 || Gravitational equations and the problems of motion. II ||Annals of Mathematics (ser. 2),  41, 455–464 || General relativity.  Co-authored with L. Infeld.
|-
| Schilpp 287 || 1940 || Considerations concerning the fundamentals of theoretical physics || Science, 91, 487–492 ||  History of physics.  Partly reprinted in Nature, 145, 920–924.
|-
| Schilpp 290 || 1941 || Demonstration of the non-existence of gravitational fields with a non-vanishing total mass free of singularities ||Tucumán universidad nac., Revista (ser. A), 2, 11–16 ||  General relativity.
|-
| Schilpp 292 || 1942 || The work and personality of Walter Nernst ||Scientific Monthly, 54, 195–196 ||  History of physics.
|- style="background:#ffddff;"
| Schilpp 293 || 1943 || Non-existence of regular stationary solutions of relativistic field equations ||Annals of Mathematics (ser. 2), 44, 131–137 ||  General relativity.  Co-authored with Wolfgang Pauli.
|- style="background:#ffddff;"
| Schilpp 295 || 1944 || Bivector fields, I ||Annals of mathematics (ser. 2), 45, 1–14 ||  Mathematics.  Co-authored with V. Bargmann.
|-
| Schilpp 296 || 1944 || Bivector fields, II ||Annals of mathematics (ser. 2)296, 45, 15–23 || Mathematics.
|-
| Schilpp 298 || 1945 || On the cosmological problem || American Scholar, 14, 137–156, 269 (correction) || General relativity.  A pre-printing of the appendix to publication #297.
|-
| Schilpp 299 || 1945 || Generalization of the relativistic theory of gravitation || Annals of mathematics (ser. 2), 46, 578–584 ||  Classical unified field theories.
|- style="background:#ffddff;"
| Schilpp 300 || 1945 || Influence of the expansion of space on the gravitation fields surrounding the individual stars || Reviews of modern physics, 17, 120–124 || General relativity.  Co-authored with E. G. Straus.  Corrections and additions, ibid., 18, 148–149 (1946).
|- style="background:#ffddff;"
| Schilpp 301 || 1946 || Generalization of the relativistic theory of gravitation, II || Annals of mathematics (ser. 2), 47, 731–741 || Classical unified field theories.  Co-authored with E. G. Straus.
|-
| Schilpp 302 || 1946 || Elementary derivation of the equivalence of mass and energy || Technion Journal, 5, 16–17, link || Special relativity.  Novel, simplified derivation in the Yearbook of American Society for Advancement of the Hebrew Institute of Technology in Haifa.  Also published in Hebrew in 1947, in the Scientific Publications of Hebrew Technical College (Institute of Technology) in Haifa.
|-
| Schilpp 307 || 1948 || Quantenmechanik und Wirklichkeit 

| Dialectica, 2, 320–324 ||  Quantum mechanics.
|-
| Schilpp 308; Weil *222 || 1948 || Generalized theory of gravitation || Reviews of modern physics, 20, 35–39 ||  Classical unified field theories.
|- style="background:#ffddff;"
| Schilpp 309 || 1949 || Motion of particles in general relativity theory || Canadian Journal of Mathematics, 1, 209–241 || General relativity.  Co-authored with L. Infeld.
|-
| Schilpp 310 || 1949 || Dem Gedächtnis Max Plancks 

| Angewandte Chimie, 61, U114 ||  History of physics.
|-
| Schilpp 311 || 1950 || The Bianchi Identities in the Generalized Theory of Gravitation || Canadian Journal of Mathematics, 2, 120–128 || Classical unified field theories.
|-
| Schilpp 313 || 1950 || On the General Theory of Gravitation || Scientific American, 182, 13–17 || Classical unified field theories.
|-
| Schilpp 314 || 1951 || The Advent of the Quantum Theory || Science, 113, 82–84 || Quantum mechanics.
|-
| Schilpp 316 || 1953 || A Comment on a Criticism of Unified Field Theory || Physical Review, 89, 321 || Classical unified field theories.
|- style="background:#ffddff;"
| Schilpp 317 || 1954 || Algebraic Properties of the Field in the Relativistic Theory of the Asymmetric Field || Annals of Mathematics, 59, 230–244 || Classical unified field theories.  Co-authored with B. Kaufman.
|- style="background:#ffddff;"
| Schilpp 318 || 1955 || An Interview with Einstein || Scientific American, 193, 69–73 || History of physics.  Co-authored with I. B. Cohen.
|- style="background:#ffddff;"
| Schilpp 319 || 1955 || A New Form of the General Relativistic Field Equations || Annals of Mathematics, 62, 128–138 || Classical unified field theories.  Simplified derivation using an ancillary field instead of the usual affine connection.  Co-authored with B. Kaufman.
|}

Book chapters

With the exception of publication #288, the following book chapters were written by Einstein; he had no co-authors.  Given that most of the chapters are already in English, the English translations are not given their own columns, but are provided in parentheses after the original title; this helps the table to fit within the margins of the page. These are the total of 31.

Books

The following books were written by Einstein. With the exception of publication #278, he had no co-authors. These are the total of 16 books.

Authorized translations
The following translations of his work were authorized by Einstein.

See also
 Albert Einstein Archives
 Einstein Papers Project
 History of special relativity
 History of general relativity
 History of the Big Bang theory
 History of quantum mechanics
 History of thermodynamics

Footnotes

References
The following references are drawn from Abraham Pais' biography of Albert Einstein, Subtle is the Lord''; see the Bibliography for a complete reference.

Bibliography

External links
 List of Scientific Publications of Albert Einstein from 1901–1922 from the Einstein website
Einstein Papers Project at the California Institute of Technology
Einstein Archives Online at Hebrew University
Einstein's publications on BibNetWiki

Scientific Publications By Albert Einstein, List Of
 Scientific Publications
Einstein, Albert List Of Scientific Publications By
Einstein, Albert List of Scientific Publications By
Einstein, Albert List of Scientific Publications By
Einstein, Albert List of Scientific Publications By
Einstein, Albert List of Scientific Publications By